Exton is a village in East Devon, Devon, England, situated on the east bank of the River Clyst, as it flows through the wider Exe Estuary. The A376 road passes through the east side of the village.

The village is served by Exton railway station, where there is an hourly train service to either Exeter Central or Exmouth. National Cycle Route 2 passes through the village.

Facilities include a Church of England church (St. Andrew's), a village hall, a petrol station, a couple of bed and breakfasts, and a pub restaurant and hostelry called the Puffing Billy.

To the immediate south is the Commando Training Centre Royal Marines.

References

Villages in Devon
Woodbury, East Devon